Daniel Nemani (born ) is a Niuean male weightlifter, competing in the +105 kg category and representing Niue at international competitions. He participated at the 2010 Commonwealth Games and 2014 Commonwealth Games. He competed at world championships, most recently at the 2011 World Weightlifting Championships.

Major results

References

1981 births
Living people
Niuean male weightlifters
Place of birth missing (living people)
Weightlifters at the 2010 Commonwealth Games
Weightlifters at the 2014 Commonwealth Games
Commonwealth Games competitors for Niue